Joseph Mbilinyi (born 1 May 1972), known for his stage names Mr. II, Sugu and 2-proud, is a Tanzanian politician, human rights activist and rapper. He was also elected to the Tanzanian Parliament in 2010 and then 2015 to 2020.

Mr. II was stems from Mbeya in Southern highlands Tanzania, started to rap in 1990, in his youth when he was still in school. His inspirations were Ice Cube, Niggaz With Attitude and above all Tupak Shakur. Mr. II was the first Tanzanian rap artist to have major success with his music. Through his music and language he express and addresses politics, social inequalities and other problems that affected Tanzanians. Most would consider his music as a voice for the voiceless, his brand of rap is soulful, lyrical, rhythmical and from the heart. This is because Mr. II is not afraid to tell it like it is, undertaking sensitive issues of concern to many Tanzanians such as democracy, child prostitution, police brutality and corruption.

He became so popular that his music reached audiences even in rural areas where rap had not been heard before. Due to the quality of his music and the message in his music, older people were more acceptance to his music and contributed to making him the first Tanzanian rapper to have a mainstream hit. Also making Mr II the M-Net Best Male Artist Grammy Award Winner for Tanzania in 2001. Mr. II is the African Great Lakes region's most popular Bongo Flava icon, and through this genre he was able to make a difference and create opportunities for the youth.

Style and message
Sugu, which loosely translates to 'Stubborn' or 'Hard', has been just that in terms of his popular longevity. With over a decade of success, Sugu has maintained his rebellious persona as a social outcast. Performing in Swahili, Sugu addresses social issues that plague both urban and rural peoples in the African Great Lakes region. His socially conscious lyrics touch on issues ranging from prostitution to immigration to the plight of street children. Examples of his politically charged music is apparent in the songs Hali Halisi, (real situation) in which he depicts the struggles of street life, and the oppressive conditions of the government, prisons, and judicial system.

"Everyday is us against the police and the police against us

The judge at the court is waiting for us

The prison officer is waiting for us
"

His lyrical style which is methodic yet quick has been mimicked by many of the genre's newcomers. His peers view “his observant narratives, canny wordplay and flamboyant delivery”  as a trademark of their genre.

Mr. II is an outspoken advocate of Tanzanian hiphop or Bongo Flava.

Sugu has seen success in various realms of the African Hip Hop scene. He is the primary organiser of the annual Tanzania Hip-Hop Summit, a yearly convention of the African Great Lakes region's most prominent and up-and-coming music stakeholders. The summit is held in Dar es Salaam in December and brings together everyone from artists to producers to TV representatives. He was also the publisher of Deiwaka, a music and arts magazine that is no longer in print. Sugu is one of the most recognisable artists in the regional Hip-hop scene, has won numerous Pan-African music awards and has performed at a number of international festivals. Regardless of his efforts to differentiate himself and his genre, Mr. II continues to be compared to the many great Hip-Hop artists from the U.S. such as Nas, Jay-Z or Run DMC.

Mr. II's song "Haki" has been hailed as the "definitive bongoflava anthem".  In Swahili Haki means freedom and justice Mr. II's lyrics address themes that are typical of Bongoflava.  Bongoflava "tackle[s] subjects faced by the continent and the world over: poverty, ambition, success, money, HIV/AIDS"

Sugu is also the Founder and Director of Deiwaka Entertainment, A company that has dedicated itself in promoting and developing Tanzanian hiphop/Bongoflava as part of helping in the fight against poverty and unemployment problems among youths in Tanzania. This company now has a website: Deiwakaworld

At the 2005 Tanzania Music Awards his album Moto Chini was nominated in the best Hip Hop Album category.

Politics
At the 2010 Tanzanian general elections, Mr. II successfully vied for Mbeya Urban constituency parliamentary seat for CHADEMA

Discography
Mr. II is the most productive Tanzanian hip hop musician, given the number of released albums:

 Ni Mimi (1995)
 Ndani ya Bongo (1996)
 Niite Mister II (1998)
 Nje ya Bongo (1999)
 Millennium (2000)
 Muziki na Maisha (2001)
 Itikadi (2002)
 Sugu (2004)
 Coming of Age-Ujio Wa Umri (2006)
 VETO (2009)
 Antivirus Mixtapes

References

External links
 Sugu aka Mr II – official website
 Deiwaka Entertainment

1972 births
Living people
Tanzanian rappers
Members of the National Assembly (Tanzania)
21st-century Tanzanian male singers
20th-century Tanzanian male singers
Tanzanian hip hop musicians
Tanzanian Bongo Flava musicians
Swahili-language singers